Dutch railway services is an index page of all the rail services operated in the Netherlands.

Railway services in the Netherlands are operated by the following  (see also rail transport operators in the Netherlands):
Nederlandse Spoorwegen
NS International
Keolis Nederland
Breng
Arriva
Connexxion
DB Regio NRW
Qbuzz

In the Netherlands there are three types of domestic train services on the main lines, these are:
Intercity Direct - Domestic Intercity Service which runs along the high speed line (up to 160 km/h). 
Intercity - An express, limited-stop service, often calling only at major railway stations; in some cases it has stops at all stations along part of the route.
Sprinter - A local service usually calling at all stations along the route, operated mostly by Flirt, Sprinter Next Generation or SLT stock.

Private operators running on regional lines use other brands: 
Sneltrein - A semi-fast service, trains skip minor stations along the route.
Stoptrein - A service with stops at all stations along the route.
The 'Sneltrein' and 'Stoptrein' services used to be operated on the main lines as well. Since 2007 both services were being phased out. As of December 2011, all 'Sneltrein' services on the main lines had been replaced by either 'Intercity' services or 'Sprinter' services. Meanwhile, all 'Stoptrein' services on the main lines had been rebranded into 'Sprinter' services.

International (high speed) services to countries such as Belgium, France and Germany are mostly operated by NS International and Thalys, although other operators have international services as well, such as Deutsche Bahn and Belgian Railway services.

Below the train services are arranged by type, and for each type ordered by number. For a combined sortable table with links to timetables, but listing less stations, see Train routes in the Netherlands.

Services

See also
 Train routes in the Netherlands

Notes

References

Prorail train routes 2013, version 12 December 2012

Nederlandse Spoorwegen
Passenger rail transport in the Netherlands